This is a list of foreign football players in the Tajik League, which commenced play in 1992. The following players must meet both of the following two criteria:
Have played at least one Tajik League game. Players who were signed by Tajik League clubs, but only played in lower league, cup and/or Asian games, or did not play in any competitive games at all, are not included.
Are considered foreign, i.e., outside Tajikistan, determined by the following:
A player is considered foreign if he is not eligible to play for the national team of Tajikistan.
More specifically,
If a player has been capped on international level, the national team is used; if he has been capped by more than one country, the highest level (or the most recent) team is used.
If a player has not been capped on international level, his country of birth is used, except those who were born abroad from Tajikistan.

In bold: Current foreign Tajik League players and their present team.

Naturalized players 
  Rustam Yatimov – Istiklol (2018–)

UEFA

Armenia
 Sarkis Karapetyan — CSKA Pamir (2017)
 Ruslan Koryan — Istiklol (2019)

Belarus
 Uladzislaw Kasmynin — Istiklol (2022–)
 Sergey Tikhonovsky — Istiklol (2018)
 Mikalay Zyanko — Istiklol (2018)
 Valeri Tsyganenko — Khujand (2011)
 Andrey Levkovets — Khujand (2022-)
 Ignatiy Sidor — Khujand (2022-)

Bulgaria
 Petar Patev — Istiklol (2021)

Estonia
 Aleksei Matrossov — Khujand (2018, 2021)

Georgia
 Tornike Dzhimsheleishvili — Khujand (2019)
 Davit Kupatadze — Khujand (2019)

Germany
Alexander Frank – Istiklol (2012–2013)

Kazakhstan
 Maksim Grek – Khujand (2021)

Latvia
 Dmitrijs Medeckis — Khayr Vahdat (2015)

Moldova
 Ion Arabadji — Dushanbe-83 (2021)
 Stanislav Ivanov — Dushanbe-83 (2021)
 Oleg Andronic — Khujand (2013–2014)
 Valeriu Andronic — Khujand (2013–2014)

Netherlands
 Huseyin Dogan — Istiklol (2021)

Russia
 Sergey Doronin — CSKA Pamir (2022-)
 Yegor Khokhlov — CSKA Pamir (2019)
 Igor Surov — CSKA Pamir (2017)
 Mikhail Zaitsev — CSKA Pamir (2019)
 Dmitry Barkov — Istiklol (2017)
 Nikita Chicherin — Istiklol (2022–)
 Shams Dzhumabaev — Istiklol (2009)
 Aleksandr Kudryashov — Istiklol (2011–2013)
 Artyom Petrenko — Istiklol (2013)
 Ruslan Rafikov — Istiklol (2011–2012), Khujand (2013) 
 Dzhamshed Rakhmonov — Istiklol (2019–2020)
 Viktor Svezhov — Istiklol (2020)
 Oleg Yezhurov — Istiklol (2011), Parvoz Bobojon (2012)
 Robert Zhilin — Istiklol (2011), CSKA Pamir (2013)
 Tohir Artikboev — Khujand (2017) 
 Artyom Serdyuk — Khujand (2021) 
 Sergei Tskanyan — Khujand (2022-)
 Ruslan Arkhipov — Parvoz Bobojon (2012)
 Artur Kamaleev — Parvoz Bobojon (2012)
 Artem Kozlov — Parvoz Bobojon (2012)
 Ruslan Kuznetsov — Parvoz Bobojon (2012), Khujand (2013), Regar-TadAZ (2014)
 Musa Ibragimov — Ravshan (2021)
 Denis Dereshev — Regar-TadAZ (2004)
 Ivan Dyagolchenko — Regar-TadAZ (2005)
 Rustam Idrisov — Regar-TadAZ (2011)
 Leonid Romanov — Regar-TadAZ (2011), Regar-TadAZ (2011)

Serbia
Mihajlo Cakić – Istiklol (2019)
Marko Milić – Istiklol (2020)
Nikola Stošić – Istiklol (2013–2020)

Spain
José Ballester – Istiklol (2015)
Manuel Bleda – Istiklol (2014–2015)

Ukraine
Dmytro Bondar – CSKA Pamir Dushanbe (2020)
Artem Gaydash – CSKA Pamir Dushanbe (2020)
Ivan Ponomarenko – CSKA Pamir (2020)
Mykyta Shevtsov – CSKA Pamir (2021)
Anatoly Starushchenko – CSKA Pamir Dushanbe (2011–2013, 2015–2019), Khayr Vahdat (2013–2015)
Artem Baranovskyi – Istiklol (2017–2018)
Oleksandr Garbar – Istiklol (2018)
Oleksandr Kablash – Istiklol (2016)
Petro Kovalchuk – Istiklol (2017)
 Oleksiy Larin — Istiklol (2019–2021)
 Andriy Mischenko — Istiklol (2021)
 Temur Partsvania — Istiklol (2022–)
 Oleksandr Stetsenko – Istiklol (2017)
Igor Leonov – Regar-TadAZ (2012)
Viktor Lykhovidko – Regar-TadAZ (2012–2013)
Viktor Stanenko – CSKA Pamir Dushanbe (2012)
Denis Sichuk – Khujand (2011), CSKA Pamir Dushanbe (2012)

CONMEBOL

Brazil
 Patrick Felipe Justino Alves — Istaravshan (2022–)
Glaúber da Silva – Istiklol (2013–2014)
Jocimar Nascimento – Istiklol (2014)
Willer – Istiklol (2013–2014)
Elton Luis – Regar-TadAZ (2013–2015)
Fabricio Tocha – Regar-TadAZ (2013)
Jailton – Regar-TadAZ (2007–2008, 2009–2012)

CAF

Cameroon
 Luc Mendjana — Dushanbe-83 (2021), CSKA Pamir (2021)
 Yavis Noah Parfat — Dushanbe-83 (2020)
 Joseph Feumba — Istaravshan (2020), Fayzkand (2020–2022), Ravshan Kulob (2022–)
 Arsene Bilé Obama — Fayzkand (2022–)
 Arthur Bougnone — Fayzkand (2021–)
 Junior Onana — Fayzkand (2021)
 Emmanuel Chiade — Istaravshan (2022–)
 Ngange Ntenge Dorian Serginho — Istaravshan (2022–)
 Mbeke Siebatcheu — Istaravshan (2020, 2022–), Kuktosh (2020)
 Tony Bikatal — Khatlon (2020–)
 Jen Gaten — Khatlon (2020–)
 Alassa Mfuapon — Khatlon (2020)
 Asomini Zbenezer — Khatlon (2021–)
 Gock Habib — Khayr Vakhdat (2013)
 Paul Rolland — Khayr Vakhdat (2013–2014)
 Olivier Mbom — Kuktosh (2021)
 Rostand Dior — Ravshan Kulob (2022–)
 Temfak Platini — Ravshan Kulob (2022–)

Gabon
 Eric Bocoum — Istiklol (2022–)

Ghana
Felix Baffoe – Energetik Dushanbe (2012), Ravshan (2013)
Gabriel Dontoh – CSKA Pamir (2009–2010,2013–2015), Energetik Dushanbe (2011–2013)
 Eiya Edward — CSKA Pamir (2019)
 Alex Peprah — CSKA Pamir (2021)
 Felix Tette — CSKA Pamir (2021)
 Caleb Ofori-Manu — CSKA Pamir (2022-)
 Benjamin Asamoah — Dushanbe-83 (2018), Khayr Vahdat (2019), Lokomotiv-Pamir (2020), Kuktosh Rudaki (2020), Ravshan (2021), CSKA Pamir (2022–)
 Collins Aduhene — Dushanbe-83 (2020)
 Idriss Aminu — Dushanbe-83 (2020), CSKA Pamir (2019–2020, 2021–)
 Nerrick Tettey — Dushanbe-83 (2021) CSKA Pamir (2022–)
 Misiam Innocent – Khayr Vahdat (2016), CSKA Pamir (2017), Kuktosh Rudaki (2019)
 Daniel Mensah – Khayr Vahdat (2015)
 Asomini Ebenezer – Khatlon (2021)
 William Gyan – Khujand (2010), Energetik Dushanbe (2011–2014)
 Benjamin Awuku – Istiklol (2013), Khujand (2014), Ravshan (2015), Istaravshan (2015)
 Agbley Jones – Khayr Vahdat (2016), Khosilot Farkhor (2017), Regar-TadAZ (2017), Khujand (2018), Dushanbe-83 (2020–2021)
 Emmanuel Kudiabor — Khayr Vahdat (2018), Dushanbe-83(2020)
 Ocran Idan — Kuktosh Rudaki (2018), CSKA Pamir (2021)
 Ishmael Klotey — Kuktosh Rudaki (2019–2020)
 Prince Arthur — Kuktosh Rudaki (2019–2020)
 Misiam Inocent — Kuktosh Rudaki (2019)
 Avuku Kaleb Oduro — Lokomotiv-Pamir (2020), Kuktosh Rudaki (2020)
 Kuaye Godson – Panjshir (2019), Khatlon(2020–)
 Sadiq Musa – Ravshan (2012–2015), Istaravshan (2015), Khosilot Farkhor (2016–2017), Regar-TadAZ (2017), Dushanbe-83 (2020–2021)
 Gershon Kwasi Akuffo – Ravshan (2013, 2015), Regar-TadAZ (2013), Istaravshan (2015), Khosilot Farkhor (2016–2017), Regar-TadAZ (2017)
 Benjamin Amankwah – Ravshan (2012), Khujand (2013–2014)
 Kingsley Osei Effah — Ravshan (2021)
 David Mawutor – Ravshan (2012–2013), Istiklol (2014, 2016–2017)
 Obed Owusu — Ravshan (2021)
 Gbeku Prosper — Ravshan Kulob (2022–)
 Ofori Samuel — Ravshan Kulob (2022–)
 Solomon Takyi – Ravshan (2012–2014), Istaravshan (2014–2015), Energetik Dushanbe (2015), Khosilot Farkhor (2016)
 Prince Viredu — Ravshan Kulob (2022–)
 Charles Narkotey – Regar-TadAZ (2007–2009), CSKA Pamir Dushanbe (2010–2012), Khujand (2014)
 David Davidson – Vakhsh Qurghonteppa (2010)
 Silvanus Evans Gbeti – Vakhsh Qurghonteppa (2013), Istiklol (2014), Khujand (2014), Dushanbe-83(2020)
 Laud Quartey – Vakhsh Qurghonteppa (2014)

Guinea
Alia Sylla – Energetik Dushanbe (2013), CSKA Pamir Dushanbe (2014)

Ivory Coast
 Azian Joseph Adolph – Dushanbe-83 (2020)
 Ya Saturnin-Hermann — Kuktosh (2021)
 Kouassi Innocent — Ravshan Kulob (2022–)
 Chris Emmanuel Kakou — Ravshan Kulob (2022–)

Uganda
Eugene Sseppuya – Istiklol (2013)

AFC

Afghanistan
Khomid Golami – Istiklol (2017)

Iran
 Muhammad Charogidorichuri — CSKA Pamir
 Hasan Huseini — CSKA Pamir (2017)
 Aghil Jalizi — CSKA Pamir (2022-)
 Mehdi Jalizi — CSKA Pamir (2017)
 Hussein Ali Boboi — Fayzkand (2022–)
 Mehdi Chahjouyi – Istiklol (2015–2016), Khujand (2016)
 Amir Memari Manesh – Dushanbe-83 (2021)
 Behrouz Pakniat — Khayr Vakhdat (2011)
 Hossein Sohrabi – Khayr Vakhdat (2012), Istiklol (2013), Khayr Vahdat (2014), Ravshan Kulob  (2015)
 Arash Akbari — Regar-TadAZ (2019–2022), Fayzkand (2021)
Muhammad Gulipour – Regar-TadAZ (2011), Khayr Vakhdat (2012, 2015), Khujand (2013)

Japan
 Ryota Noma – Istiklol (2021)

Kyrgyzstan
 Daniel Tagoe – Dushanbe-83 (2021)
 Vladislav Volkov — Khayr Vakhdat (2013–2014)
 Vladimir Verevkin — Khayr Vakhdat (2015)
 Valery Kashuba — Khujand (2015)
 Tursunali Rustamov — Khujand (2014, 2019)
 David Tetteh – Regar-TadAZ (2006–2008)
 Elijah Ari – Vakhsh Qurghonteppa (2010), Regar-TadAZ (2011, 2013–2015), Energetik Dushanbe (2012)

Turkmenistan 
 Rahat Japarow — CSKA Pamir (2021)
 Wahyt Orazsähedow — FC Istiklol (2020)

Uzbekistan
 Azamat Akhmedov — CSKA Pamir (2022-)
 Jasur Ashurov — Fayzkand (2020)
 Dilshodzhon Baratov — Fayzkand (2020–2021)
 Orzubek Buriev — CSKA Pamir (2021)
 Shahzod Abdurakhimov — Eskhata (2021–)
 Uktamjon Hazratov — Eskhata (2022–)
 Dilshod Khushbakov — Eskhata (2022–)
 Akhror Inoyatov — Eskhata (2021)
 Akobir Turaev — Eskhata (2021)
 Jasur Kurbonov — Fayzkand (2020, 2021)
 Miromil Lokaev — Fayzkand (2022–)
 Anvar Murodov — Fayzkand (2020–2021, 2022), Ravshan (2021)
 Azizdzhon Zaripov — Fayzkand (2020)
 Jamshed Khasanov — Istaravshan (2019)
 Jafar Ismoilov — Istaravshan (2021), Regar-TadAZ (2022–)
 Nodirkhon Kamolov — Istaravshan (2022–)
 Shakhzod Mamurdzhonov — Istaravshan (2021), Eskhata (2022–)
 Khurshid Olimov — Istaravshan (2021)
 Javokhirbek Rasulov — Istaravshan (2022–)
 Jakhongir Safarov — Istaravshan (2021), Eskhata (2022–)
 Shakhzod Shamsiddinov — Istaravshan (2021)
 Akhrorbek Uktamov — Istaravshan (2021)
 Otabek Zokirov — Istaravshan (2022–)
 Zufardjon Akbaraliev — Istaravshan (2020)
 Saiddoston Fozilov — Istaravshan (2020)
 Shakhzod Shamsiddinov — Istaravshan (2020)
 Tulkinjon Umarov — Istaravshan (2019–2020)
 Jahongir Abdumominov — Istiklol (2018)
 Mukhammad Isaev — Istiklol (2022–)
 Jalil Kimsanov — Istiklol (2019), Regar-TadAZ (2020)
 Davron Mirzaev — Istiklol (2014), Regar-TadAZ (2015)
 Jamshidbek Khomidov — Khatlon (2022-)
 Rustamjon Kuchkarov — Khatlon (2022-)
 Asiljon Begimkulov — Khujand (2019–)
 Firdavs Abdusalimov — Khujand (2021–)
 Mamur Ikramov — Khujand (2020)
 Olim Karimov — Khujand (2021)
 Siroj Khamrayev — Khujand (2020–)
 Shokhrukh Makhmudkhozhiev — Khujand (2020–)
 Samandar Ochilov — Khujand (2020–)
 Sanjar Rihsiboev — Khujand (2020), Eskhata (2022–)
 Amirjon Safarov — Khujand (2020–2021), Fayzkand (2022–)
 Andrey Sidorov — Khujand (2020)
 Nodirbek Ibragimov — Kuktosh Rudaki (2019, 2021), CSKA Pamir Dushanbe (2020), Ravshan (2021)
 Abbos Ikromov — Kuktosh Rudaki (2020), Fayzkand (2020)
 Alizhon Alizhonov — Kuktosh (2021)
 Asadbek Islomov — Kuktosh (2021)
 Muhiddin Odilov — Kuktosh (2019-2021)
 Sukhrob Rakhmonov — Kuktosh (2021)
 Bunyod Shodiev — Ravshan (2021), Kuktosh (2021)
 Behzod Turdikulov — Parvoz Bobojon (2012)
 Mukhriddin Akhmedov — Ravshan Kulob (2021), Ravshan Zafarobod (2022-)
 Zufarjon Akbaraliev — Ravshan Zafarobod (2022–)
 Muchriddin Akhmedov — Ravshan Zafarobod (2022–)
 Dostonbek Berdikulov — Ravshan Zafarobod (2022–)
 Behruz Dustmurodov — Ravshan Zafarobod (2022–)
 Javokhir Gaibullaev — Ravshan Zafarobod (2022–)
 Zufarjon Karakulov — Ravshan Zafarobod (2022–)
 Abbos Abdulloyev — Regar-TadAZ (2006–2007)
 Sayriddin Gafforov — Regar-TadAZ (2012), Ravshan Kulob (2013–2014), Khosilot (2017)
Sardor Eminov – Regar-TadAZ (2008–2013, 2020)
Farrukh Nurliboev – Regar-TadAZ (2019–2020)
Bahrom Umarov – Regar-TadAZ
Farkhod Yuldoshev – Regar-TadAZ (2007, 2012–2013), Vakhsh Qurghonteppa  (2009–2010), Istiklol (2011), Istaravshan (2014)
 Savely Abramov — Regar-TadAZ (2022–)
 Sergey Prokhorov — Ravshan Zafarobod (2022–)

CONCACAF

United States
Troy Ready – Vakhsh Qurghonteppa (2009–2013)

Notes

References

External links

 
 
Tajik League
Football in Tajikistan
Tajikistan sport-related lists
Association football player non-biographical articles